Rufino "Chico" Bernedo Zorzano (21 December 1926 – 3 February 2006) was a Chilean basketball player. At a height of 1.72 m (5'7 ") tall, he played at the small forward position. He is generally considered to be the best Chilean basketball player of all time. In November 2013, Sebastián Piñera, the President of Chile, inaugurated a sports center bearing his name, in his honor, in the city of Temuco.

Club career
Bernedo played club basketball in Chile with Universidad Católica (Basket UC) between 1946 and 1950.

National team career
Bernedo was the long-time captain of the senior men's Chilean national basketball team. With Chile, he competed at the men's basketball tournaments at the 1952 Summer Olympics and the 1956 Summer Olympics. With Chile's national team, he also won bronze medals at the 1950 FIBA World Championship and the 1959 FIBA World Championship. He also played at the 1958 FIBA South American Championship.

Personal life
Bernedo was known by the nicknames "Chico", "El Petizo", and "El Rufo". Bernedo died on 3 February 2006, at the age of 79, due to heart failure.

References

External links

1926 births
2006 deaths
Basketball players at the 1952 Summer Olympics
Basketball players at the 1956 Summer Olympics
Chilean men's basketball players
1959 FIBA World Championship players
Olympic basketball players of Chile
People from Cautín Province
Small forwards
1950 FIBA World Championship players